The Lehigh Coal and Navigation Company (LCAN) (1988–2010) was a modern-day anthracite coal mining company headquartered in Pottsville, Pennsylvania. It acquired many properties and relaunched the Lehigh Coal Companies brand in 1988. The LCAN ran strip mining operations in the Panther Creek Valley east of Lansford, Pennsylvania along U.S. Route 209 with vast properties dominating the coal areas of Tamaqua, Coaldale, and Lansford.

LCAN properties were largely Panther Creek Valley-based real estate assets that were acquired from Lehigh Coal Mine Company (1792-1822) and the builders of the Lehigh Canal and the first American blast furnaces, the Lehigh Coal & Navigation Company, both which spearheaded the American industrial revolution. The new company was incorporated in 1988, acquiring LC&N assets after bankruptcy proceedings.

Background
The Lehigh Coal & Navigation Company was a prominent coal mining and transportation infrastructure company first established in 1822 after four years of successfully delivering regular shipments of anthracite coal to the docks of Philadelphia via their pioneering Lehigh Canal. The remaining 8,000-acre anthracite-rich tract between Jim Thorpe and Tamaqua originally owned by the Lehigh Coal Mine Company is arguably the richest vein of high quality anthracite known in the world with the possible exception of the valley floor deposits of the Wyoming Valley, but without a River above leaking into shafts, far easier to mine. Like most commercially feasible coal mines today in the USA, the ongoing mining operations use mountain top mining (strip mining) techniques.

Brand history
Through the 19th and part of the 20th centuries, LC&N mined the tract in Summit Hill, Nesquehoning, Lansford, Coaldale and Tamaqua. In the 1960s, LC&N ceased its operations. The coal lands were acquired by the Fazio Brothers. Bethlehem Steel bought it in 1974 and ran it until 1989. In 1989, James Curran bought the property and reestablished the Lehigh Coal & Navigation Company brand. By 2008, the new LC&N's plans for expansion put them into debt as sales plummeted during the recession, and they became bankrupt.
 
The earlier company, called "the Old Company" had owned and operated an extensive system of coal mines in Carbon and Schuylkill Counties, two canals, the Lehigh Canal and the Delaware Division of the Pennsylvania Canal, the historic Mauch Chunk & Summit Hill Railway (MC&SH or Summit Hill and Mauch Chunk Railroad), the funicular railway called the Ashley Planes, and a railroad system, the Lehigh and Susquehanna Railroad (L&S). The L&S extended from the foot of River Street in Wilkes Barre and North Branch Canal docks at Wilkes Barre, Pennsylvania on the Susquehanna River to the Lehigh River Gorge past Mauch Chunk, Allentown and Easton, Pennsylvania. In the 1870s, the L&S was leased to the Central Railroad of New Jersey), which extended the route into a Scranton-NYC prestige line. It also built the Mauch Chunk Switchback Railway to move coal.

Demise of the new company
In the mid-1960s, LC&N ceased its operations, and eventually the railroad revenues which had kept it awash in cash flow, failed with the crisis and collapse of U.S. railroads, leases held by leaseholders such as the Central Railroad of New Jersey (subsidiary: Lehigh and Susquehanna Railroad), Lehigh and New England Railroad and the Lehigh Valley Railroad (and a few others being liquidated) with most mainlines being forced into Conrail. Today the mainline pioneered by the LC&N are still the mainstay of several key transportation corridors in Northeastern Pennsylvania and operated by Norfolk-Southern, or Reading, Blue Mountain and Northern Railroads.
Like other Pennsylvania mining companies, Lehigh Coal and Navigation Company was criticized for polluting the environment, and received several legal notices and fines. The LCAN company (re-branding) was founded by James J. Curran, a Schuylkill County attorney. In 2004, the re-incarnated company was forced into bankruptcy by some of its creditors, and some of its land was at risk of being sold for back taxes. In 2006, the company's operations were suspended unless Curran stepped aside and kept out of actual operations, citing a violation of a consent decree from previous complaints, so a new management team took over. LCAN went bankrupt again in 2008 and was sold to creditors, who created Lehigh Anthracite and disestablished the New Company.

References

Coal companies of the United States
Mining in Pennsylvania
Companies based in Schuylkill County, Pennsylvania
Energy companies established in 1988
Non-renewable resource companies established in 1988
American companies established in 1988
1988 establishments in Pennsylvania
2010 disestablishments in Pennsylvania